The Beijing–Kowloon railway, also known as the Jingjiu railway is a railway connecting Beijing West railway station in Beijing to Shenzhen railway station in Shenzhen, Guangdong Province. It is connected with Hong Kong's East Rail line across the border, which had its southern terminus in Hung Hom in southern Kowloon until 2022.

History

It is a dual-track railway. Construction began in February 1993. It has 790 bridges and 160 tunnels. Located between Jinghu railway (Beijing–Shanghai) and Jingguang railway (Beijing–Guangzhou), it was built to alleviate the congested Jingguang railway, and to foster development in the areas to the east of Jingguang railway.

The idea had been proposed for a long time, and some of the sections, such as the Jiujiang Yangtze River Bridge, were built before construction of the whole line officially began. Some were converted from existing sections, such as between Jiujiang and Nanchang, and Fuyang and Shangqiu.

It multiplexes with the Guangmeishan railway (Guangzhou–Meizhou–Shantou railway) between Longchuan and Dongguan. It joins the Guangshen railway (Guangzhou–Shenzhen railway, formerly the Chinese section of the Kowloon–Canton railway) at Dongguan, and follows the same route. Within Hong Kong, it shares the same pair of tracks with the East Rail line (formerly British section of the Kowloon–Canton railway).

Beijing–Kowloon through train services are currently provided on the Jingguang railway and Guangshen railway, instead of the Jingjiu railway, because Beijing-Kowloon line emphasizes freight traffic and pass through less major cities. Passengers are required to go through customs and immigration checks for the cross-border service.

Completion of cross-harbour section of the MTR's Sha Tin to Central Link project on 15 May 2022 saw the extension of the East Rail line from Hung Hom station underneath Victoria Harbour to Hong Kong Island. The East Rail line now terminates at Admiralty station in its namesake business district via a new station at Exhibition Centre.

Places served

Beijing
Gu'an County
Bazhou
Renqiu
Suning
Shenzhou
Hengshui
Zaoqiang
Daying
Nangong
Qinghecheng
Linqing
Liaocheng
Yanggu
Taiqian
Liangshan
Heze
Caoxian
Shangqiu
Bozhou
Santangji
Fuyang
Funan
Huaibin
Huangchuan
Xinxian
Macheng
Xinzhou
Huangzhou
Xishui
Wuxue
Jiujiang
Lushan
De'an
Yongxiu
Nanchang
Xiangtang
Fengcheng
Zhangshu
Xingan
Xiajiang
Jishui
Ji'an
Taihe
Xingguo
Ganzhou
Nankang
Xinfeng
Longnan
Dingnan
Heping
Longchuan
Heyuan
Huizhou
Dongguan
Shenzhen
Hong Kong

See also

 Rail transport in China
 List of railway lines in China
 Guangzhou–Shenzhen Railway
 Beijing–Guangzhou high-speed railway
 China Railways

Notes

References

External links

MTR Intercity Through Train e-Ticketing Services, Train Route

Standard gauge railways in Hong Kong
Railway lines in China
Rail transport in Beijing
Rail transport in Tianjin
Rail transport in Hebei
Rail transport in Shandong
Rail transport in Henan
Rail transport in Anhui
Rail transport in Hubei
Rail transport in Jiangxi
Rail transport in Guangdong
Railway lines opened in 1996
25 kV AC railway electrification